Ashutosh Kaushik (born 1981 or 1982) is an Indian actor and reality TV participant. Kaushik was the winner of MTV Hero Honda Roadies 5.0 in 2007 and the 2nd season of Bigg Boss in 2008. Later he was also seen in MTV Roadies 8 and in 2nd season of Bigg Boss. He has had a role in the movies Zila Ghaziabad and Kismat Love Paisa Dilli .

Filmography

Television

Personal life
Kaushik was arrested in summer 2009 for riding a motorbike under the influence of alcohol. He was found guilty, fined, sentenced to one day in jail, and his license was suspended. In the 2020s, he has gone to court asking for the incident to be expunged from the internet under the right to be forgotten.

Kaushik and his wife, Arpita, a banker, married in 2020.

References 

Reality show winners
Living people
1980s births
Bigg Boss (Hindi TV series) contestants
Big Brother (franchise) winners